Kamshybek Kunkabayev (born 18 November 1991) is a Kazakhstani professional boxer. As an amateur, he won a silver medal at the 2017 and 2019 World Championships, and bronze at the 2020 Summer Olympics.

Amateur career

Olympic result
Tokyo 2020
Round of 16: Defeated Yousry Hafez (Egypt) 5–0
Quarter-finals: Defeated Ivan Veriasov (ROC) 4–1
Semi-finals: Defeated by Richard Torrez (USA) RSC

World Championship results
Hamburg 2017
Round of 16: Defeated Max Keller (Germany) 5–0
Quarter-finals: Defeated Bakhodir Jalolov (Uzbekistan) 3–2
Semi-finals: Defeated Fokou Arsene (Cameroon) 5–0
Final: Defeated by Magomedrasul Majidov (Azerbaijan) 4–1

2019 Yekaterinburg
Round of 16: Defeated Ayoub Ghadfa (Spain) KO
Quarter-finals: Defeated Nelvie Tiafack (Germany) 5–0
Semi-finals: Defeated Justis Huni (Australia) W/O
Final: Defeated by Bakhodir Jalolov (Uzbekistan) 5–0

Professional career

Early career
Kunkabayev made his professional debut against Issa Akberbayev on 23 August 2020. Kunkabayev was dominant throughout the bout and in the second round, he landed a heavy body shot which put his opponent on the canvas. Kunkabayev was declared the winner after Akberbayev was unable to recover from the knockdown.

On 18 December 2020, Kunkabayev fought for a second time as a professional against Serhiy Radchenko. Kunkabayev was declared the winner after his opponent retired in the corner at the end of the fourth round. On 27 February 2021, Kunkabayev fought against Server Emurlaev. Kunkabayev dominated his naturally smaller opponent and at the end of the sixth round, landed a flurry of heavy punches which visibly hurt his opponent. This resulted in Emurlaev retiring in his corner at the end of round, after declining to continue. Kunkabayev faced Steven Ward on 11 December 2021. He won the fight by a seventh-round technical decision. The decision was given at the end of the seventh round, as Ward was unable to continue competing due to a cut on his forehead, which resulted from an accidental clash of heads.

Kunkabayev faced Farrukh Juraev on 25 March 2022, at the Baluan Sholak Sports Palace in Almaty, Kazakhstan. He made quick work of his opponent, as he won the fight by a second-round technical knockout.

Professional boxing record

References

External links

1991 births
Living people
Kazakhstani male boxers
AIBA World Boxing Championships medalists
People from Kyzylorda
Super-heavyweight boxers
Boxers at the 2020 Summer Olympics
Medalists at the 2020 Summer Olympics
Olympic bronze medalists for Kazakhstan
Olympic medalists in boxing
Olympic boxers of Kazakhstan
21st-century Kazakhstani people